Dekoven is an unincorporated community and coal town in Union County, Kentucky, United States.

In 1843 a native of Flanders, Belgium started a coal mining operation. He named the community DeKoven, Flemish for "a camp or village among the hills". A post office was established in 1871 and discontinued after 1938.

References

Unincorporated communities in Union County, Kentucky
Unincorporated communities in Kentucky
Coal towns in Kentucky